Carl Schwende (20 February 1920 – 30 December 2002) was a Canadian fencer. He competed in the individual foil event at the 1960 Summer Olympics.

References

1920 births
2002 deaths
Canadian male fencers
Olympic fencers of Canada
Fencers at the 1960 Summer Olympics
Sportspeople from Basel-Stadt
Swiss emigrants to Canada
Fencers at the 1954 British Empire and Commonwealth Games
Commonwealth Games medallists in fencing
Commonwealth Games gold medallists for Canada
Commonwealth Games silver medallists for Canada
Commonwealth Games bronze medallists for Canada
Pan American Games medalists in fencing
Pan American Games bronze medalists for Canada
Fencers at the 1959 Pan American Games
Medallists at the 1954 British Empire and Commonwealth Games
Medallists at the 1958 British Empire and Commonwealth Games
Medallists at the 1962 British Empire and Commonwealth Games